Emerico Biach (born 23 November 1893, date of death unknown) was an Italian swimmer. He competed in the men's 200 metre breaststroke event at the 1924 Summer Olympics.

References

External links
 

1893 births
Year of death missing
Italian male swimmers
Olympic swimmers of Italy
Swimmers at the 1924 Summer Olympics
People from Nagykanizsa
Italian male breaststroke swimmers